Bogar, Bhogar, or Boganathar was a Tamil Shaivite Siddhar who lived sometime between 550 and 300 BC. He was a disciple of Kalangi Nathar. He was born in Vaigavur near Palani Hills. He received his education from his mother and his grand father described in several traditions and texts. Bogar himself describes his native roots in his book "Bogar 7000". Bogar went from Tamil Nadu to China and taught about enlightenment, this is also mentioned in his book Bogar 7000. Bogar is said to be in "nirvikalpa samadhi" below the sanctorum of Palani Murugan hill temple. The Tamraparniyan sea route was adopted by Bogar in his travels from South India to China via Sri Lanka (ancient Tamraparni).

Legacy 
A disciple of Agastya's teachings, Bogar himself taught meditation, alchemy, yantric designs and Kriya yoga at the Kataragama Murugan shrine, inscribing a yantric geometric design etched onto a metallic plate and installing it at the sanctum sanctorum of the Kataragama temple complex. Bogar is one of the earliest pilgrims to have traversed the Murugan Tiruppadai of Sri Lanka. According to legends and the temple scriptures of Palani temple, Bogar created the idol of Murugan at the hill temple in Palani by mixing nine poisonous herbs (Navapashanam) using a unique procedure. He also established the temple for Murugan in Poombarai Kuzhanthai Velappar temple Kodaikanal Tamil Nadu, India.

There is an extant statue of lord Murugan in Navapashanam. The milk that was poured on this statue has been said to have mixed with some of the herbs thereby proving to be an effective cure for the diseases during the time The priests of Palani Murugan temple were said to have been the descendants of Pulipani, one of Bogar's students, until the sixteenth century.

According to siddha medicine documents, Bogar was the discoverer of an elixir of immortality. The Pharmacognosy is the best known of his treatises. His other works are on yoga and archery, and a glossary of medicine.
He came to Palani after finishing a meditation in the Meru hills.

Notable Works 
 Bogar Saptha Kaandam 7000
 Bogar Jananasaagaram 550
 Bogar Nigandu 1200
 Bogar Nigandu karukidai
 Bogar Nigandu kaiyedu
 Bogar Vaithiya kaaviyam 1000
 Bogar 700
 Bogar Panchapatchi Sathiram
 Bogar Karpam 300
 Bogar Varma Soothiram 100
 Bogar Malai Vaagadam
 Bogar 12000
 Bogar Nigandu 1700
 Bogar Vaithiyam 1000
 Bogar Sarakku Vaippu 800
 Bogar Updesam 150
 Bogar Rana Vaagadam 100
 Bogar Gnanasaaraamsam 100
 Bogar Karppa Soothiram 54
 Bogar Vaithiya Soothiram 77
 Bogar Muppu Soothiram 51
 Bogar Gnana Soothiram 37
 Bogar Attanga Yogam 24
 Bogar Poojavithi 20
 Tao Te Ching (the saint is often identified with Laozi in India)

Notable disciples 
 Mahavatar Babaji
 Pulipani
 Konkanar
 Karuvoorar
 Nandeeswar
 Kamala Muni
 Satta Muni
 Macchamuni
 Sundarandar

See also 
 Arulmigu Dhandayuthapani Swamy Temple, Palani
 Agastya 
 Tirumular
 Kalanginathar

References 

Ayyavazhi mythology
Tamil Hindu saints
Indian Hindu saints
Laozi
Indian expatriates in China
People from Dindigul district
Indian Shaivite religious leaders
Indian yogis
Siddha medicine
Ayurvedacharyas
Indian Hindu missionaries
Hindu sages
Indian male poets
Tamil poets